Chang Su-hsin (born 4 October 1990) is a Taiwanese footballer who plays as a defender for the Chinese Taipei women's national team.

References

1990 births
Living people
Women's association football defenders
Taiwanese women's footballers
Footballers from Taipei
Chinese Taipei women's international footballers
Okayama Yunogo Belle players